Soul Samba (aka Bossa Nova Soul Samba) is an album by American saxophonist Ike Quebec recorded in 1962 and released on the Blue Note label. It was Quebec's final recording before his death in January 1963.

Reception

The Allmusic review by Scott Yanow awarded the album 4 stars and stated "Quebec emphasizes warm, long tones (reminiscent of Coleman Hawkins in a romantic fashion), and his sidemen play light and appealing but nonetheless authoritative bossa rhythms".

Track listing
All compositions by Ike Quebec except where noted
 "Loie" (Kenny Burrell) - 3:10
 "Lloro Tu Despedida" (Aldo Cabral,  Joraci Camargo, Emanuel Lacordaire) - 3:01
 "Goin' Home" (Antonín Dvořák, William Arms Fisher) - 5:39
 "Me 'n You" - 5:58
 "Liebesträume" (Franz Liszt) - 3:42
 "Shu Shu" (Antônio Almeida, Carlos Monteiro DeSouza) - 3:31
 "Blue Samba" - 5:18
 "Favela" (Joraci Camargo, Heckel Tavares) - 4:00
 "Linda Flor" (Henrique Vogeler) - 3:28

Bonus tracks on CD reissue:
"Loie" [alternate take] (Burrell) - 3:32
 "Shu Shu" [alternate take] (Almeida, DeSouza) - 3:19
 "Favela" [alternate take] (Camargo, Tavares) - 3:21

Personnel
Ike Quebec - tenor saxophone
Kenny Burrell - guitar
Wendell Marshall - bass
Willie Bobo - drums
Garvin Masseaux - chekere

References

Blue Note Records albums
Ike Quebec albums
1962 albums
Albums produced by Alfred Lion
Albums recorded at Van Gelder Studio